Kao Chih-kang (born 7 February 1981 in Taichung County, Taiwan) is a Taiwanese professional baseball player (position: catcher).

Career
After brief amateur career in the Taiwan Cooperative Bank he was drafted by the Uni-President Lions of Chinese Professional Baseball League in early 2005 and stayed in this team to date. Kao is widely regarded as the best Taiwanese catchers of his generation, and has been a frequent member of the Chinese Taipei national baseball team since 2001.

Kao is best known for hitting the game-winning RBI in the Chinese Taipei versus South Korea match in the 2003 Asian Baseball Championship series. This victory qualified the Taiwan national baseball team for the 2004 Olympics.

He has competed at both the 2004 and 2008 Summer Olympic Games.

Before the 2012 season, Kao signed his second two-year contract with the Uni-President Lions.

In November 2011, Kao was appointed as the representative of players by the IBAF Asia Department.

Career statistics

See also
Chinese Professional Baseball League
Uni-President Lions

References

External links
 
 

1981 births
2006 World Baseball Classic players
2009 World Baseball Classic players
2013 World Baseball Classic players
2015 WBSC Premier12 players
Asian Games medalists in baseball
Asian Games silver medalists for Chinese Taipei
Baseball players at the 2002 Asian Games
Baseball players at the 2004 Summer Olympics
Baseball players at the 2008 Summer Olympics
Baseball players at the 2010 Asian Games
Living people
Medalists at the 2002 Asian Games
Medalists at the 2010 Asian Games
Olympic baseball players of Taiwan
Baseball players from Taichung
Uni-President 7-Eleven Lions players
Uni-President Lions players
Uni-President 7-Eleven Lions coaches